is a Japanese banker. In 2020, she was appointed an executive director at the Bank of Japan, becoming the first woman to hold such a position.

Biography
Shimizu completed a bachelor's degree in urban engineering at the University of Tokyo. She also holds a master's degree in international policy studies from Stanford University.

Shimizu joined the Bank of Japan in 1987, working in the financial markets division and in foreign exchange operations. In 2010, she was appointed chief of the Takamatsu branch, becoming the first woman branch chief at the bank. From 2016 to 2018 she was the general manager of the Bank of Japan's Chief Representative Office for Europe located in the City of London.

In May 2020 she started a four-year term as executive director at the bank. She will also continue as the head of the bank's Nagoya branch, a position she has held since 2018.

References

Central bankers
Japanese bankers
University of Tokyo alumni
Stanford University alumni
Living people
Year of birth missing (living people)